Between Brothers is an American television sitcom centered on four middle-class African American men in their late twenties, living in Chicago.  It premiered on September 11, 1997 on Fox, with the second season airing on UPN, until March 2, 1999.  The lead characters were played by Kadeem Hardison, Dondré T. Whitfield, Tommy Davidson, and Kelly Perine.

Synopsis
Buddy comedy about four black men sharing an apartment in Chicago, Illinois. Charles and James Winston (played by Kadeem Hardison and Dondre T. Whitfield) are brothers. Charles, the responsible older one, is a sportswriter for The Chicago Examiner while irresponsible James sold real estate. Mitchell (Tommy Davidson) - the mooch, a junior high school history teacher, and just returned to the apartment after his second wife, Audrey, had thrown him out. Dusty (Kelly Perine), the short fellow with the loud clothes, had moved up from Indiana to take a job as a weekend TV on WEQT-TV, Channel 64.

Most of the episodes focused on their job and dating problems and the not-always-helpful advice they gave to each other.

Cast
Kadeem Hardison as Charles Winston
Dondré T. Whitfield as James Winston
Kelly Perine as Dustin "Dusty" Canyon 
Rachael Crawford as Terri
Tommy Davidson as Mitchell Ford

recurring
Brian Doyle-Murray as Stuart Franklin
Sandy Brown as May Ford

Episodes

Season 1 (1997–98)

Season 2 (1999)

Syndication
Reruns of the series aired in the United States on the TV One cable network however they stopped as of 2014. The first-season episodes are available on Crackle as of 2020.

External links 
 

1997 American television series debuts
1999 American television series endings
1990s American black sitcoms
1990s American sitcoms
English-language television shows
Fox Broadcasting Company original programming
Television shows set in Chicago
Television series by Sony Pictures Television
UPN original programming
American television series revived after cancellation